The Cooper-Bristol, formally called the Cooper Mk.I or the Cooper T20, is a Formula 2 racing car, built, designed, and developed by British manufacturer Cooper Cars in 1952.

Development history and technology
With the T20 in 1952, Cooper not only interrupted the series of Formula 3 racing cars, but also built the first vehicle for Formula 2. The designation T was originally introduced by Cooper for the 500 cubic centimeter racing car. These racing cars ran in Formula 3 and Formula Junior.

Through this commitment, Cooper had a large customer base of drivers and their sponsors. Many of them wanted to enter the highest class of motorsport and expected a car from Cooper to do so. The answer was quickly found there and the T20 was developed. The T20 was based on the T15 and, like there, had the engine in a simple frame in front of the driver. The suspension and wheels were also taken over from the T15.

Racing history
The engine used was the 2-liter engine from Bristol, a six-cylinder, the basis of which was the engine from the BMW 328. The engine made about 130 hp. Therefore, the car had to be light and easy to handle in order to keep up with the Ferrari that dominated at the time. As expected, the car had no chance against the vehicles from Italy, but it did score the first points for Cooper in the Formula 1 World Championship by Alan Brown at the Swiss Grand Prix in 1952. Mike Hawthorn achieved his first success on a T20 and was in Britain became a popular racing driver almost overnight.

References

Cooper racing cars
Formula Junior cars
Formula Two cars
1950s cars
Cars of England